Shahid Siyavashi is a transport ship operated by the Navy of the Islamic Revolutionary Guard Corps of Iran.

Construction
The ship was built in Iran.

Operational history

On 15 April 2020, the ship had an encounter with a U.S. Navy vessel. United States Central Command stated that the ship had been involved in "harassment" of their ships, while an IRGC official dismissed the account as a "Hollywood tale" and said "Americans blocked the path of our vessel against international regulations and refused to answer our radio calls but faced our forces' powerful reaction". This event resulted in United States President Donald Trump tweeting "I have instructed the United States Navy to shoot down and destroy any and all Iranian gunboats if they harass our ships at sea".

In June 2020, Iranian media published footage of a Sevom Khordad transporter-erector-launcher and radar (TELAR) unit aboard afterdeck of Shahid Siyavashi, launching a missile.

References

Ships of the Islamic Revolutionary Guard Corps